Nkpor is a town in Idemili North local government area of Anambra state. The town of Nkpor had an estimated population of 109,377 in 2007.
It is attached to the much larger city of Onitsha to the west,  Nkwelle-Ezunaka to the north, Ogidi to the east and Obosi to the south. The name 'Nkpor' is derived from the adulteration of the Igbo word nkpogha meaning 'repositioning'.

History
The indigenes of Nkpor are descendants of a hunter called Okoli Oti. Okoli Oti had three sons Omaliko, Oji and Dimudeke. Omaliko who was the eldest is the ancestor of the people of Abatete, the descendants of Oji are the people of Umuoji, while Nkpor indigenes are descended from Dimudeke. The people of Nkpor were originally called 'Umudim' and dwelt in the area where the town of Oraukwu is located now. However, due to incessant wars and strifes with their neighbours, their elder brothers (Abatete and Umuoji) forcefully relocated them to their present site which was then uninhabited. This event lead to the derivation of the name 'Nkpor' (ndi akpoghalu akpogha—nkpogha—nkpogho—Nkpor {this is the supposed sequence of transformation and adulteration of the name}). Nkpor is made up of five villages named after the children of Dimudeke: Isiome(Umusiome village), Ngwu(Isingwu village), Ububa(Ububa village), Nwafor(Amafor village) and Mgbachu. The igwe (king) traditionally comes from umusiome village (because they are the 'eldest'). Umusiome village consists of nine kindreds, each named after a single principal ancestor. Three of these kindreds are descendants of the sons of the first king of Nkpor. The descendants of Ezeonwu the first son, hold the 'ofor nwa di okpala' and therefore cannot be kings, but they crown the sons of Arinze, the middle son, who are the kings.  The descendants of Ezekwem, the youngest son, sit near the king as trustworthy assistants and advisors. For this reason only the descendants of Arinze can be kings in Nkpor. It is noteworthy that these kindreds who are descendants of the first king cannot inter-marry. Akuzo is one of the sons of Umusiome. The people of Nkpor though known in ancient times as fierce warriors, from which they derived the envious name 'obodo dike' (the land of the brave), are peace-loving people.

Nkpor At A Glance

Nkpor community is the home of Anambra State School of Nursing and a General Hospital named after the State's University teaching hospital - Chukwuemeka Odumegwu Ojukwu University. There are also some highly rated hotels in and near Nkpor being one of the closest towns to the commercial Igbo city of Onitsha.

Amidst many killings in Igboland, a renowned lawyer known in the Orlu area - Darlington - was murdered obviously because of his involvement in handling of a number of high-profile cases in the area. Another human rights activist of Igbo descent - Kenechukwu Okeke - was killed in November 2021 at Nkpor. He was also said to be a strong supporter of Nigeria's President - Mohammadu Buhari and had instituted a number of legal cases before his murder.

International Connections
Nkpor, Igbo and indeed the entire indigenous Igboland (or Igbo nation) is powerfully connected and accessible politically, economically, socially and internationally to Africa and to the globe (or to the world) by land, air and by waters as well as by rail to some extent having at least 4 international airports, waterways and rivers that empty unto the sea as well as operational international land borders. Modern railway infrastructure is being developed, modernised and expanded within indigenous Igbo nation at the moment. The United Nations Declaration on the Rights of Indigenous Peoples (UNDRIP) was adopted by the General Assembly on Thursday, 13 September 2007. Besides, its ancient traditional and cultural religious practices practiced by a size of its population, it is also powerfully connected for leadership by faith mostly through Christianity and Judaism or what could be called Igbo-Judeo-Christian faith and ritual. Igbo People and Igbo nation's relationship with the Jewish People and the State of Israel is one of pride and as a matter of fact, remains unbreakable. Besides, known rivers that wash into the sea from the indigenous country, a number of international airports are operating within her - increasing economic activities, creating and increasing business and other Organization operations, providing jobs, increasing international connections and prospering Aviation Industry, revenue generation and prosperity whilst making trade deals and operations easier and rewarding. Specifically, Nkpor and surrounding indigenous Igbo cities such as Onitsha, Awka, Nnewi, the entire Anambra State, Enugu State, and Ebonyi State as well as indigenous cities of neighboring Igala nation such as Okene in Kogi are within the easiest service coverage of and would benefit economically from the newly commissioned Anambra International Cargo and Passenger Airport at Umueri in Omambala by the people. There is also another airport in the not too father away Enugu International Airport. Anambra International Cargo and Passenger Airport is within the greater Onitsha metropolis or Anambra East and one of the renowned commercial aircraft carriers operating in the area is Air Peace.
Ideally rather than flying, passengers using the road could travel from Abuja to Owerri through Okene and Onitsha. They can also travel from Lagos route to Owerri through Benin and Onitsha.

Economy
The economy of Nkpor like the rest of Greater Onitsha Metropolis is largely trade and commercial with a few newly Crude Oil producing wells in the Omambala and the Ogbaru areas fields the economy of the entire area is being transformed into a mega-economy from the traditional commercial activities at Onitsha. Gradually, over the years, through sustained excellent leadership, industrial estates and foreign companies have continued to spring up in Greater Onitsha - creating skilled jobs, chain of lucrative businesses, foreign direct investments and improving economic activities generally in the region often known for producing significant number of highly skilled graduates yearly from renowned Universities in the area such as Nnamdi Azikiwe University, Chukwuemeka Odumegwu Ojukwu University, and University of Nigeria Nsukka amongst others.

References

Populated places in Anambra State